Silvan Wicki (born 13 February 1995) is a Swiss sprinter. He represented his country at two European Championships without advancing from the heats.

International competitions

1Did not finish in the final

Personal bests
Outdoor
100 metres – 10.11 (+2.0 m/s, Bulle 2020)
200 metres – 20.60 (+1.4 m/s, Langenthal 2018)
Indoor
60 metres – 6.59 (Magglinen 2021)
200 metres – 21.74 (Magglingen 2014)

References

1995 births
Living people
Swiss male sprinters
Competitors at the 2017 Summer Universiade
Competitors at the 2019 Summer Universiade
Athletes (track and field) at the 2020 Summer Olympics
Olympic athletes of Switzerland